Bollini is an Italian surname. Notable people with the surname include:

Fabio Bollini (born 1983), Sammarinese footballer
Francisco Bollini (born 1888), Argentine fencer
Germano Bollini (born 1951), Sammarinese sport shooter
Gianluca Bollini, Sammarinese footballer
Paolo Bollini (born 1960), politician in San Marino (San Marinese Socialist Part)
Pascal Bollini (born 1966), former professional footballer

Italian-language surnames